Jean Marchat (1902–1966) was a French film actor who appeared in around fifty films during his career. He made his film debut in 1931 and appeared in Maurice Tourneur's Departure the same year.

Selected filmography
 Departure (1931)
 In the Name of the Law (1932)
 Stormy Waters (1941)
 The Pavilion Burns (1941)
 Majestic Hotel Cellars (1945)
 The Mysterious Monsieur Sylvain (1947)
 Three Boys, One Girl (1948)
 The Barton Mystery (1949)
 Shadow and Light (1951)
 The Passerby (1951)
 The Red Needle (1951)
 They Were Five (1952)
 Zoé (1954)
 Nights of Montmartre (1955)
 Mademoiselle from Paris (1955)
 Napoléon (1955)
 The Miracle of the Wolves (1961)
 Climates of Love (1962)
 The Other Truth (1966)

References

Bibliography
 Waldman, Harry. Maurice Tourneur: The Life and Films. McFarland, 2008.

External links

1902 births
1966 deaths
People from Lyon Metropolis
French male film actors
20th-century French male actors